The Waller Times  in Waller County, Texas  publishes local news, community/civic events, school news, and sports news weekly on Wednesdays. It was founded in 1991 and is still family owned and operated.

The paper is published weekly.

References

External links 

 Official site

Newspapers published in Greater Houston
Waller County, Texas
1991 establishments in Texas
Weekly newspapers published in Texas